Safety in Numbers is the debut solo album by Margaret Urlich, released in 1989. The first single, "Escaping", was number one for three consecutive weeks in New Zealand and peaked at number 17 in Australia. Urlich won an ARIA Award in 1991 for Best Breakthrough Artist - Album for Safety in Numbers. The album achieved platinum status in New Zealand and triple platinum status in Australia. Safety in Numbers has sold over 265,000 copies. It was recorded at Studios 301 in Sydney, Australia, mostly between August and November of 1988 but also in April of 1989.

Track listing 

Adapted from album notes and Spotify.

Personnel 
Credits adapted from cassette liner notes.

 Margaret Urlich – lead vocals, arrangements (track 11), backing vocals (tracks 3, 4, 6, 8-10), keyboards (track 11)
 Robyn Smith – production (tracks 1-10), arrangements (tracks 1-10), acoustic guitar (track 3), drums (tracks 1-10), keyboards (tracks 1-10), guitar (track 1), Milo tin (track 1), sitar (track 7)
 Adrian Bolland – engineering (tracks 1, 2, 7), mixing (tracks 1, 2, 5, 7, 8, 10)
 Peter Bondy – additional production (track 11), keyboards (track 11)
 Peter Cobbin – mixing (track 11), synthesizer (track 11)
 Angelique Cooper – recording engineering assistance (track 11)
 Colin Simpkins – recording engineering assistance
 Jim Taig – production (track 11), mixing (tracks 3, 4, 6, 9), recording (track 11)
 Sid Wells – engineering (tracks 3-6, 8-10)
 Phil Whichett – production (track 11), musical direction (track 11)

 Kristen Wolek – recording engineering assistance
 Leon Zervos – mastering
 Karen Boddington – backing vocals (tracks 1-3, 5, 7-9)
 Alan Davey – flugelhorn (track 9)
 Tommy Emmanuel – guitar (track 5)
 Merran Laginestra – backing vocals (tracks 1, 2, 7)
 Geoff Lundgren – fretless bass (track 11)
 Andrew Oh – saxophone (tracks 2, 5, 6)
 Mark Punch – backing vocals (track 8-10), guitar (tracks 2, 4, 6-10)
 Mark Williams – backing vocals (tracks 1-3, 5, 7)
 Polly Walker – photography
 Debbie Watson – hair, makeup, and styling

Charts

Weekly charts

Year-end charts

Certifications

Awards and recognition

References

ARIA Award-winning albums
Margaret Urlich albums
1989 debut albums